Meotipa sahyadri is a spider species of the genus Meotipa that is mainly indigenous to the Western Ghats in India.

Meotipa sahyadri, named after the Sanskrit name for the Western Ghats  i.e., Sahyadri.

References

Endemic fauna of India
Spiders of the Indian subcontinent
Spiders described in 2017
Theridiidae